The first USS Rainier was a United States Navy patrol vessel in commission from 1917 to 1919.

Rainier, originally named Patrol and then Angel, was built as a civilian schooner in 1917 at Portland, Oregon. The U.S. Navy purchased her on 7 June 1917 for use as a patrol vessel during World War I. She was commissioned on 30 July 1917 at Mare Island Navy Yard at Vallejo, California, Lt. James L. Kauffman in command, as USS Rainier. She never received a section patrol (SP) number.

Service history
Attached to Division 2, United States Pacific Fleet, Rainier was assigned to the Mexican Patrol. She operated off Southern California and Mexicos Baja California for the rest of World War I and until 1 March 1919.

Rainier was decommissioned on 28 May 1919 at Mare Island Navy Yard and was stricken from the Navy List on 8 September 1919. She was sold to E. W. Cullen of Alameda, California, on 5 August 1921.

References

Rainier at Department of the Navy Naval History and Heritage Command Online Library of Selected Images: U.S. Navy Ships -- Listed by Hull Number "SP" #s and "ID" #s -- World War I Era Vessels without Numbers (listed alphabetically by name)
NavSource Online: Section Patrol Craft Photo Archive Rainier

Schooners of the United States Navy
Patrol vessels of the United States Navy
World War I patrol vessels of the United States
Ships built in Portland, Oregon
1917 ships